Arackaparambil Kurien Antony (born 28 December 1940) is an Indian politician and lawyer who served as the Minister of Defence of India from 2006 to 2014. He previously served as the 6th Chief Minister of Kerala from 1977 to 1978, 1995 to 1996 and again from 2001 to 2004. He currently serves as the Chairman of the Disciplinary Action Committee of the All India Congress Committee, Congress Working Committee, and member of the Congress Core Group and Central Election Committee.

Antony served as Defence Minister for almost 8 years, making him the longest serving Defence Minister in India. He has thrice been the 8th Chief Minister of Kerala and Leader of Opposition once in Kerala Legislative Assembly. He has also served as Treasurer of All India Congress Committee from 1994-1995.

Early life and education
A. K. Antony was born to a Suriyani Nasrani family at Cherthala, near Alleppey in Travancore as the son of Arackaparambil Kurien Pillai and Aleykutty Kurian. His father died in 1959 and Antony self-financed part of his education through odd jobs.

Antony completed his primary education at Holy Family Boys High school (Lower primary) and Government Boys High school (Upper primary), Cherthala and completed his Bachelor of Arts from Maharaja's College, Ernakulam and Bachelor of Law from Government Law College, Ernakulam.

Political career
Antony entered politics as a student leader in Cherthala Taluk (Alleppey District) as an activist of the Kerala Students Union under the guidance of M. A. John. He has been an active leader of many strikes like Oru Ana Samaram (Single Penny Strike). He became the youngest president of Kerala Students Union in 1966 and also served in the Kerala Pradesh Congress Committee (KPCC) before becoming an All India Congress Committee (AICC) General Secretary in 1984. When he became KPCC president in 1972, he was the youngest person to hold that post. He was elected again as KPCC president in 1987, and was defeated by Vayalar Ravi in the KPCC presidential elections in 1991.

Congress politics and party faction
Antony founded the Congress (A) political party when he split from the Indian National Congress (Urs), a splinter group of the Indian National Congress The party was primarily active in Kerala and joined the LDF ministry headed by E. K. Nayanar during 1980–1982. After the fall of the Nayanar ministry, the party merged with the Congress in 1982, but Antony was not given any office until the death of Indira Gandhi. The members of the party have continued as a faction in the local congress afterwards.

Chief Minister of Kerala

On accusations in the Rajan case, K. Karunakaran resigned and Antony was made the 8th Chief Minister of Kerala, becoming the youngest Chief Minister of the state at the age of 36 serving from years 27 April 1977 to 27 October 1978.

Again, when Karunakaran resigned in connection with the ISRO case Antony was made the 16th Chief Minister of Kerala, serving from 22 March 1995 to 9 May 1996. He was the Leader of Opposition in the Kerala Legislative Assembly between 1996 and 2001. Antony was elected and served a third term from 17 May 2001 to 29 August 2004. He failed to retain power on the first two occasions as Chief minister. In 2004, immediately after the Congress in Kerala suffered a total rout in the Lok Sabha elections amid factional politics and in-fighting within the Congress Party, Antony resigned as Chief Minister. He was succeeded by Oommen Chandy.

It was at Antony's behest that the decision to construct the new Legislature Complex was taken in 1977.  During his tenure, he introduced the Unemployment Allowance, Festival Allowance for the State Employees, Prohibition of Arrack and the steps initiated to revive the economy of Kerala. Several initiatives were taken in the fields of Higher education, science & technology, Biotechnology (including the Rajiv Gandhi Centre for Biotechnology at Thiruvananthapuram), and Information technology, under his ministries. 

It was also under his rule that the Kannur University was inaugurated by bifurcating the University of Calicut.  The University of Sanskrit was founded in 1994. The Indian Institute of Management and the National Institute of Technology at Kozhikode were established in the years 1996 and 2002 respectively. The Akshaya project was implemented in 2002 by providing E-literacy to the people those who haven't it and opening Akshaya centres in the remote rural areas of the state, thus ensuring Internet availability all over the state, aiming to make Kerala the first complete E-literate state of India. Several initiatives were taken in the fields of Higher education, science & technology, Biotechnology, and Information technology, under his ministries. The Infopark at Kochi was established in the year 2004. The IT@school project and introduction of Information Technology in  school level were initiated in 2001 by Third Antony ministry, making Kerala the first Indian state to do so.

Antony carried out Asian Development Bank aided "Modernization of Government Plan". He also liberalised education by allowing several private engineering and medical colleges to open in Kerala and championed the state as an investment destination. He also ordered the closure of the Kerala Coca-Cola plant in 2004 citing drought and the non-availability of drinking water.

Government offices

Union Minister for Civil Supplies

Antony was a Member of Parliament in the Rajya Sabha between 1993 and 1995 and was the Minister for Civil Supplies, Consumer Affairs and Public Distribution for a year in 1994 during the tenure of Prime Minister P. V. Narasimha Rao. He resigned on moral grounds as food minister in 1994 when his ministry was involved in a sugar import scandal, despite there being no allegations against him.

Union Minister for Defence

In 2005, Antony entered the Rajya Sabha and was inducted into the Union Council of Ministers as Defence Minister following Natwar Singh's expulsion from the Congress and Pranab Mukherjee's transfer to the Ministry of External Affairs. After the Congress again won the elections in 2009 and formed the government once again under Prime Minister Manmohan Singh, Antony retained the portfolio of Defence for the second term becoming the longest-serving Defence Minister of India in a continuous stint for 8 years. His "Buy and Make Indian" campaign saw the cancellation of billion of dollars in purchases of foreign arms, while at the same time stunting domestic production by restricting investments.

Other positions
He held the post of Chairman of the Indian Statistical Institute in Kolkata (2012 to 2014), President of the Institute for Defence Studies and Analyses and Chancellor of Defence Institute of Advanced Technology (2006 to 2014).

Political party role
In the Manmohan Singh Cabinet, Antony was the senior member of the Cabinet Committees on Accommodation, Economic Affairs, Parliamentary Affairs, Political Affairs, and Security.

He is considered as political guru of Rahul Gandhi.

Antony's political skills and long experience in government have also led him to heading a large number of committees of Ministers in the government, a device that has been employed to obtain consensus within the members of the governing coalition on contentious issues.

Issues

Civil Services reform
In order to professionalize the Civil Services, Antony led in decision on creation of a Central Civil Services Authority (CCSA) to oversee the higher bureaucracy.

Impeachment of Chief Justice of India

In 2018, Antony is one of the signatories to impeachment notice against Chief Justice of India Dipak Misra.

Public image
Antony is known for his incorruptible record and simple personal life and his intolerance towards corruption in public life. He was ranked among top 10 Most Powerful Indians for the year 2012 by the Indian Express.

10th Prime Minister of India Atal Bihari Vajpayee admired Antony for his simplicity, gentleness and his zeal for reforms and change as a way to ensure acceleration of Kerala's all-round development.

After Pranab Mukherjee was nominated for the 2012 President of India election, Antony was placed as the second-in-command after Prime Minister Manmohan Singh in the Cabinet of India.

Wikileaks
WikiLeaks cables claimed that Antony was the one of the only two leaders, the other being PR Dasmunsi, who criticised Sanjay Gandhi during the 1976 AICC session in Guwahati during Emergency when the latter's political standing was on the rise, asking "what sacrifices he has made for the party or the country".

Personal life

Antony is a self-proclaimed atheist and is married to Elizabeth who is a Kerala High Court lawyer and is the founder of the Navoothan Charitable Foundation. They have two sons.

Honours, awards and international recognition

See also

 List of Rajya Sabha members from Kerala
 List of current members of the Rajya Sabha

References

Notes

Books featuring AK Antony and further reading
 
 
 .

External links

 AK Antony Official bio-data at india.gov.in
 Cabinet of Prime Minister Manmohan Singh Prime Ministers Office, Archived
 Kerala Chronicles: When Gandhi-loyalist AK Antony turned into an implacable Indira foe in the 1970s The News Minute
 Biography: AK Antony Official biography at niyamasabha.org

|-

|-

|-

|-

|-

|-

|-

|-

|-

|-

1940 births
People from Kerala
Chief Ministers of Kerala
Defence Ministers of India
Members of the Cabinet of India
Indian atheists
Indian editors
Indian National Congress politicians from Kerala
Writers from Kerala
Living people
Maharaja's College, Ernakulam alumni
Malayalam-language writers
Malayali politicians
Politicians from Alappuzha
Rajya Sabha members from Kerala
Leaders of the Opposition in Kerala
Chief ministers from Indian National Congress
Indian Congress (Socialist) politicians
Kerala MLAs 1970–1977
Kerala MLAs 1977–1979
Kerala MLAs 1991–1996
Kerala MLAs 1996–2001
Kerala MLAs 2001–2006
Indian National Congress (U) politicians
Union Ministers from Kerala